Donald Leroy Bren (born May 11, 1932) is an American businessman.  He is chairman and owner of the Irvine Company, a US real estate development corporation. With a net worth of $16.2 billion, he ranks number 112 on the 2022 Forbes Billionaires List.

Early life
Bren is the son of Marion Newbert and Milton Bren. His father Milton was a naval officer, talent agent, and successful movie producer while his mother Marion was a prominent civic leader. His father was Jewish, and his mother was of partial Irish descent. His parents divorced in 1948. Bren's father remarried in 1948 to Academy Award-winning actress Claire Trevor. His mother remarried in 1953 to steel business man Earle M. Jorgensen.

Bren graduated from the University of Washington where he received a bachelor's degree in business administration and economics. He was a member of Beta Theta Pi. fraternity. He tried out for the 1956 Olympic ski team but did not qualify following an injury. After college, he served as an officer in the United States Marine Corps.

Career
Bren built his first house in Newport Beach, Orange County, California, with a $10,000 loan in 1958. He began his business career in 1958 when he founded the Bren Company, which built homes in the county. In 1963, he and two others started the Mission Viejo Company (MVC) and purchased 10,000 acres to plan and develop the city of Mission Viejo, California. Bren was President of MVC from 1963 to 1967. International Paper bought the Bren Co. for $34 million in 1970, then sold it back to Bren for $22 million in 1972 following the recession. Bren took the proceeds and in 1977 joined a group of investors to purchase the 146-year-old Irvine Company. Bren was the largest shareholder of the resulting consortium, owning 34.3% of the company and received the title of Vice-chair of the board. By 1983, he was the majority owner of the firm and was elected chairman of the board. By 1996, he had bought out all outstanding shares to become the sole owner.

By 2005, OC Weekly wrote that Bren "wields more power than Howard Hughes ever did, probably as much as any man in America over a concentrated region—determining not only how people live and shop but who governs them." In 2006 the Los Angeles Times wrote "[s]imply put, Orange County looks like Orange County...because of the influence of [Donald Bren]." In an interview in 2011, Bren summarized his real estate investment strategy: "What I learned was that when you hold property over the long term, you're able to create better values and you have something tangible to show for it."
Forbes, in its 2019 edition of "The 400 Richest Americans", ranked Bren as the wealthiest real estate developer in the US and 32nd "Richest American" with an estimated net worth of $17 billion.

It is believed that the Irvine Company owns more than 120 million ft.² of real estate – the majority of which is located in Southern California. The company's holdings include several hotels, marinas, golf courses, 550 office buildings, 125 apartment complexes and more than 40 shopping centers. He currently owns a 97% stake in the MetLife Building in Manhattan.

Philanthropy
In 2008, BusinessWeek named Bren one of the top ten philanthropists in the nation, with his contributions to various causes such as education, conservation and research among other areas exceeding $1 billion. In 2023, Brens lifetime contributions reached $2.1 billion with $470 million coming from 2022.

In 2010, Bren was honored with the National Philanthropy Day of Orange County "Donald Bren Legacy of Giving Award." At the time Bren spoke about his work in philanthropy, saying that "I do try to bring the same level of attention to both my philanthropic and business ventures."

Education
Bren has donated more than $200 million to support programs in K-12 public schools and higher education institutions in Southern California.

Many of Bren's contributions have benefited universities in California, including the University of California, Irvine, University of California, Santa Barbara, and Chapman University. At the University of California, Bren "has contributed more to support endowed chairs than any other single donor in UC's history." Privately and through the Donald Bren Charitable Trust, he has directed contributions to support its faculty and programs. At UC Irvine, the Bren Events Center, the Donald Bren School of Information and Computer Sciences and the recently built Donald Bren Hall are named after him, honoring his patronage of the school. The University also named its Claire Trevor School of the Arts after his stepmother. Additionally, UC Santa Barbara named Bren Hall and the Bren School of Environmental Science & Management, a graduate school, after him as well. Bren made a donation to the Bren School of Environmental Science and Management to "enhance and strengthen the school's core interdisciplinary programs, personnel, and special activities." When commenting about the continued support from Bren, UC Santa Barbara Chancellor Henry T. Yang said, "Bren's vision for developing a peerless, world-leading institution offering an interdisciplinary program of environmental science, management, and policy has been a tremendous source of inspiration and leadership for the Bren School."

In August 2007, Bren pledged $20 million to the recently established UC Irvine School of Law. The purpose of the gift was to establish an endowment to help recruit and support a nationally recognized dean and 11 distinguished law scholars, and also to provide the dean with discretionary start-up funding. In recognition of the gift, the school was initially named the UC Irvine Donald Bren School of Law. In 2008 an agreement was reached between Bren and the University that the school would not bear his name. Erwin Chemerinsky, dean of the law school, said, "We are deeply grateful for the Bren gift, but it was decided between the chancellor and Mr. Bren that our name should be parallel to other UC schools."

Bren, a trustee at the California Institute of Technology, supported new faculty as Bren Scholars and endowed five Bren Professorships.

In 2003, Bren also donated $1 million to the Marine Corps University in Quantico, Virginia. The funds were used to endow two academic chairs focusing on ethics & leadership and innovation & transformation.

In addition to higher education, Bren has also contributed significantly to K-12 public schools in California.

He has supported THINK Together, a provider of after-school services for K-12 students in Southern California. Bren first donated to this organization in 2001 with a contribution that helped the after-school program expand its services to 40 schools in the Santa Ana district. According to officials, the contribution would benefit more than 10,000 students over 10 years.

In 2006, Bren also made a contribution to the Irvine Unified School District in Irvine, California, in the amount of $20 million. This donation would be used by the district to hire art, music and science teachers. The funding would benefit students in grades fourth through sixth over a 10-year period, giving them access to music, arts and science programs. This contribution is in addition to the $25 million that Bren provided to Irvine schools in 2000. According to Tim Shaw, former chief executive officer of the Irvine Public Schools Foundation, the annual gift "seeded the strong public support of elementary arts, music and science instruction."

Conservation
In March 2009, he was ranked 9th in The (London) Sunday Times' "Green Rich List"- a list of the 100 wealthiest people, who have either invested in green technology/businesses or made large contributions to environmental causes. Bren's placement on the list was due to his $20 million in donations to UC Santa Barbara's School of Environmental Science.

Throughout a 30-year time span, Bren donated  of land to be used for parks, greenways, recreation and wilderness preserves. Of this,  were designated as the Irvine Ranch National Natural Landmark. During the 2006 ceremony at Crystal Cove State Park to celebrate this designation, California Governor Arnold Schwarzenegger said "it is really a spectacular gift that [Bren's] given to [California]. Donald Bren is...the ultimate of generosity. Not only what he contributes to the environment, but what he contributes continuously to the community, if it is in education, if it is in arts, if it is music, if it is the environment, the 10s of millions of dollars he's invested in the environment, to protect the environment. He's an extraordinary man."

In 2008, the state of California also designated the land as the first California Natural Landmark because of the land's ecological value. The protected land, once a part of Irvine Ranch, is operated by The Irvine Ranch Conservancy. Recently, Bren completed his pledge to set aside more than 50,000 acres of the original 93,000-acre ranch as open space by designating 20,000 acres (81 km2) to Orange County, California, as an open-space and parklands gift in June 2010. The gift was accepted in a unanimous decision by the Orange County Board of Supervisors and was the largest donation of private property to public ownership in Orange County history. In a ceremony in the same year, he was recognized for donating more than 20,000 acres of pristine wilderness that he gave to Orange County, asking only that it remain open space forever. In August 2014, the Irvine Company announced plans to donate and preserve 2,500 additional acres of land previously approved for housing, bringing the preserved lands of the Irvine Ranch to 60%.

Gale Norton, former U.S. Secretary of the Interior, speaking about Bren's history of land donations, said, "The Irvine Ranch illustrates what cooperative conservation is all about. A conservation-minded corporate citizen is working hand-in-hand with federal and state agencies, The Nature Conservancy, local communities, private citizens and other partners to thoughtfully and purposefully create an environment where both people and wildlife can thrive."

Research
In 2007, Bren made a $2.5 million commitment to the Burnham Institute for Medical Research in La Jolla, California. The contribution established The Donald Bren Presidential Chair and the money donated was used to support research conducted by the Institute such as cancer, neurodegeneration, diabetes, and childhood diseases among others.

From a 2011 interview, solar energy is one of the areas he is exploring for a future philanthropic gift. Bren said, "It's my view that solar energy may be the ultimate solution for energy for most of the world. I believe, based on what little I know about it, that there is a possibility of a breakthrough."

Awards and honors
In 2006 the Los Angeles Times named Bren as both the most powerful and wealthiest person in Southern California, and the Orange County Business Journal named him "Businessperson of the Year" based on the company's office expansion, new building construction, and Bren being recognized for his conservation efforts by the federal government. In 2011 the Urban Land Institute awarded Bren its first Vanguard Award, calling him "one of the most consequential developers in American history." In 2014 he was named on OC Register's list of the 100 most influential people in Orange County.

In 2004 Bren received the University of California Presidential Medal, the University's highest honor, because of his financial support throughout the years which at the time was more than $43 million. During the award ceremony, former UC President, Robert Dynes said, "[Bren's] passionate philanthropy and commitment to educational excellence have helped strengthen the university."

In 1998, Bren received the Marine Corps University Foundation's Semper Fidelis Award, which recognizes a distinguished American leader whose commitment to personal and professional excellence embodies those qualities of leadership and character uniquely associated with the United States Marine Corps. Past award recipients include former President George H.W. Bush and former Secretary of State George P. Schultz. The Foundation also presented Bren with its most prestigious award in 2003, the General Leonard F. Chapman Medallion named in honor of the 24th Commandant of the United States Marine Corps.

Bren serves on the board of trustees at Caltech and the Los Angeles County Museum of Art. He was elected a Fellow with the American Academy of Arts & Sciences in 2007 in the category of Business, Corporate and Philanthropic Leadership.

Personal life
Bren has been married three times:
His first marriage was to Diane Bren and they had three children:
Cary Bren (born 1959), served as president of Orange County home builder California Pacific Homes.
Steve Bren (born 1960), a former professional auto racing driver and real estate developer.
His second marriage was to Mardelle Bren in 1977. They had one daughter:
Ashley Bren (born 1968)
In May 1998, Bren, an Episcopalian, married Brigitte Muller, an entertainment lawyer born in La Jolla, California, in a church ceremony at the All Saints Episcopal Church in Beverly Hills, California. He and his wife reside in Newport Beach, California. They had a son in 2003.

Bren also has three children by two former companions.

Bren keeps a low public profile and as he explains, "I'm not a public official. I'm a businessman, I'm a builder, I'm a planner... And if I feel that I've done the job well, that's the satisfaction I get, not from doing interviews or being more public." OC Weekly described Bren in 2005 as "one of the nation's least public billionaires", who guards his privacy "jealously". The Los Angeles Times that year canceled a pending article discussing how the fictional Caleb Nichol of the popular television show The O.C. was based on Bren, allegedly because the Irvine Company threatened to withdraw advertising. The Times denied the allegation and stated that the story was canceled for timing reasons.

Politics
Bren supported Republican Pete Wilson's Senate and gubernatorial campaigns, and Democrat Dianne Feinstein, whom he calls "a great senator for California."

References

External links

Biography at the Irvine Company
Donald Bren, Chairman of the Board of the Irvine Company
Biography at UCI's Bren School of Information and Computer Sciences
Donald Bren: Southern California's richest man in his own words by Los Angeles Times

1932 births
Living people
American billionaires
American philanthropists
American real estate businesspeople
Businesspeople from California
Philanthropists from California
California Institute of Technology trustees
Fellows of the American Academy of Arts and Sciences
United States Marines
University of Washington Foster School of Business alumni
American people of Irish descent
American people of Jewish descent
American Episcopalians
Real estate and property developers
People from Newport Beach, California
California Republicans